Lawrence Arthur Dumoulin Cannon (April 28, 1877 – December 25, 1939) was a Canadian lawyer, politician, and Puisne Justice of the Supreme Court of Canada.

Born in Arthabaska, Quebec, the son of Lawrence John Cannon and Aurélie Dumoulin, he received a Bachelor of Arts degree in 1896 from Université Laval. In 1899 he received an LL.L also from Université Laval. He was called to the Bar in 1899 and practised law. His brother was Lucien Cannon, a politician and cabinet minister.

In 1908, he was elected to the City council of Quebec City. In 1916, he was elected to the Legislative Assembly of Quebec for the riding of Québec-Centre as a Liberal. He was re-elected in 1919 but was defeated in 1923.

He returned to private practice until he was appointed to the Court of King's Bench of Quebec in 1927. He was appointed to the Supreme Court in 1930 and served until his death in 1939.

His great-nephew Lawrence Cannon was a Member of Parliament from 2006 to 2011, serving in Prime Minister Stephen Harper's cabinet.

External links
 Supreme Court of Canada biography

1877 births
1939 deaths
Lawrence Arthur Dumoulin
Justices of the Supreme Court of Canada
Lawyers in Quebec
Quebec Liberal Party MNAs
Université Laval alumni
Quebec people of Irish descent
Quebecers of French descent
Université Laval Faculté de droit alumni